Emelia Jane Burns (born 18 February 1982) is an Australian actress, who has had roles in films and television series.

Films
Burns appeared in the 2007 action film The Condemned, written and directed by Scott Wiper, as Yasantwa, a convict on death row from Ghana, transported to a remote island to compete in an illegal human hunting television show. Burns also appeared in the 2011 horror movie Don't Be Afraid of the Dark.

Television
Burns is well known for her role as Diva, in two seasons of the children's television series The Elephant Princess. She has also appeared on The Starter Wife as Mudawa, Sea Patrol as Zuraya, the children's television series H2O: Just Add Water, and in MTV's The Shannara Chronicles as Commander Tilton.

Filmography

Film

Television

References

External links

1982 births
Australian film actresses
Australian television actresses
Living people
People from Brisbane
Australian actors of African descent